James Stewart, Duke of Ross (March 1476 – January 1504) was a Scottish prince, and the second son of King James III of Scotland and his wife, Margaret of Denmark. James was heir presumptive to his brother until his death, and was Archbishop of St Andrews and Lord Chancellor of Scotland.

Titles and offices
He was made Marquess of Ormond at his baptism. He was created Earl of Ross in 1481 after that title was forfeited to the crown by John, Lord of the Isles.

Of his father's three sons, James of Ross was the favourite. James III even tried to marry him to Edward IV's daughter, Catherine of York. This increasing preference shown to James of Ross was a factor in the rebellion of his elder brother (the future James IV) against their father; and later, as king, James IV was suspicious of his brother's loyalty.

Nonetheless, when the elder James succeeded to the crown in 1488, he raised James of Ross's title to Duke of Ross, aged 12.

Around May 1497, his brother the King nominated James of Ross (then 21 years old) to be Archbishop of St Andrews. King James thought that would keep James of Ross from rebelling against him. Also, James of Ross was a minor, and so the revenues of the archbishopric would be controlled by King James.

James of Ross also became Lord Chancellor of Scotland in 1502.

Name
He was one of three brothers, his two brothers being King James IV of Scotland and John Stewart, Earl of Mar.  It may seem surprising that there were two brothers both called James, but in late medieval Scotland it was not uncommon to have two brothers, or occasionally even three, with the same Christian name.

Arms
The arms of James of Ross were: Quarterly 1st and 4th: Royal Arms of Scotland, 2nd: Gules, three lions rampant argent (Ross) 3rd: Or, three piles gules (Brechin)

References

James
Lord chancellors of Scotland
Court of James IV of Scotland
Abbots of Arbroath
Abbots of Dunfermline
Archbishops of St Andrews
James
James Stewart
Earls of Ross
Peers created by James III
15th-century Roman Catholic archbishops in Scotland
16th-century Roman Catholic archbishops in Scotland
Chancellors of the University of St Andrews
1476 births
1504 deaths
Dukes of Ross
Sons of kings
Non-inheriting heirs presumptive